The Man from the East is a 1914 American short silent Western film written, directed by and starring Tom Mix.

Cast
 Tom Mix as Tom Bates
 Goldie Colwell as May
 Leo D. Maloney as Ranch Foreman
 Pat Chrisman as Stage Driver
 Inez Walker as May's Aunt
 Hoot Gibson as Butler
 C.W. Bachman as Valet (uncredited)
 Ed Jones as Hotel Keeper (uncredited)
 R.H. Kelly as Tough (uncredited)
 Susie Morella as Maid (uncredited)

See also
 Hoot Gibson filmography
 Tom Mix filmography

External links
 

1914 films
1914 short films
1914 Western (genre) films
American silent short films
American black-and-white films
Selig Polyscope Company films
Silent American Western (genre) films
1910s American films